La Mariposa Negra' is 1920 Filipino silent film directed by José Nepomuceno and starring Juanita Ángeles and .

References

1920 films
Philippine silent films
Philippine black-and-white films